The Paper Wedding is a 1989 made for television Canadian film directed by Michel Brault. It was entered into the 40th Berlin International Film Festival.

Plot
Claire is a teacher in Montreal, Quebec, who lives alone. Her lover, Milosh, is married and their relationship is strained. Claire's sister, Annie, a lawyer, has a problem. The visa of her client Pablo, a political refugee from Chile illegally working as a dishwasher in a restaurant, is about to expire. She asks Claire to marry him so he can remain in Canada. Claire reluctantly agrees. Before the modest civil ceremony can be concluded, immigration agents arrive, but everyone escapes.

Claire's mother is thrilled to arrange a big church wedding and reception instead. Afterwards, Claire and Pablo go their separate ways. But soon, immigration agents are back knowing what's going on and the two are forced to live together. There, Claire notices that Pablo (who has fallen for her) has nightmares. When they get to know each other, Pablo tells Claire that he was a tortured political prisoner, among other things.

In case they are questioned by the Canadian officers, Claire and Pablo try to make up a story about how they met. Pablo's romantic story touches Claire, and in time, she finds she has fallen for him as well.

Cast
 Geneviève Bujold as Claire
 Dorothée Berryman as Annie
 Manuel Aranguiz as Pablo
 Monique Lepage as Mother
 Teo Spychalski as Milosh

Production
The film was made with a budget of $846,000.

Release
The film premiered in August 1989 at the Montreal World Film Festival, before being broadcast on television by Radio-Québec in the fall. After Berlin programmer Moritz de Hadeln saw the television film, he requested a 35mm print so that the film could be screened at Berlin, leading to the film's subsequent wider theatrical distribution in 1990. The film earned $100,000 in France during its theatrical release.

Reception
The 1990 American film Green Card, starring Gérard Dépardieu and Andie MacDowell, featured marked similarities to The Paper Wedding.

The film won the award for Best TV Feature at the 1990 Banff World Media Festival. It won six Gémeaux Awards in December 1990, including for best dramatic production, best photography (Sylvain Brault), best writing (Jefferson Lewis), best direction (Michel Brault), best actor in a miniseries or television film (Aranguiz) and best actress in a miniseries or television film (Bujold).

References

Works cited

External links

1989 films
1989 drama films
Films directed by Michel Brault
Films set in Montreal
Canadian drama television films
National Film Board of Canada films
French-language Canadian films
1980s Canadian films
1980s French-language films